Banana Ridge is a 1942 British comedy film directed by Walter C. Mycroft and starring Robertson Hare, Alfred Drayton and Isabel Jeans. The film is based on a 1938 stage play of the same name by Ben Travers. It was made at Welwyn Studios. Michael Denison accompanied his wife Dulcie Gray for her screen test for the film, which led some years later to his casting in his breakthrough role in My Brother Jonathan. The film was a success at the box office. Hare and Drayton appeared together in another comedy Women Aren't Angels the following year.

Two colleagues come to worry that a mysterious young man may be their son from liaisons with the same woman during the First World War. They are persuaded to give him a job at "Banana Ridge" one of the company's rubber plantations in the Malay States. The young man's romance with the bosses' daughter threatens this plan, as does his mother's plan to reveal who is his real father.

Cast
 Robertson Hare as Willoughby Pink
 Alfred Drayton as Digby Pound
 Isabel Jeans as Sue Long
 Nova Pilbeam as Cora Pound
 Adele Dixon as Mrs Ellie Pound
 Valentine Dunn as Mrs Pink
 Stewart Rome as Sir Ramsey Flight
 John Stuart as Chief Police Officer Staples
 Audrey Boyes as Typist 
 Patrick Kinsella as Jonesy 
 Basil Lynn as Mason 
 Gordon McLeod as Mr. Tope  
 Mignon O'Doherty as Mrs. Bingley  
 Ley On as Chinese 'Boy' 
 Wally Patch as Police Officer  
 Lloyd Pearson as Mr. Bingley  
 Charles Stewart as Dance Instructor 
 Dulcie Gray as Bit Part

References

Bibliography
 Murphy, Robert. Realism and Tinsel: Cinema and Society in Britain, 1939-1949. Routledge, 1992.
 Warren, Patricia. Elstree: The British Hollywood. Columbus Books, 1988.
Wood, Linda. British Films, 1927–1939. British Film Institute, 1986.

External links
 

1942 films
1942 comedy films
British comedy films
Films set in London
Films set in Malaysia
Films shot at Welwyn Studios
British black-and-white films
1940s English-language films
1940s British films